Crvena Reka, (literally: Red River) is a village located in the municipality of Bela Palanka, Serbia. According to the 2011 census, the village has a population of  688 inhabitants.

References

Populated places in Pirot District